Grant Goldman (3 February 1950 – 17 January 2020) was an Australian radio and television presenter. He worked as both a voice-over and live presenter.

Goldman was the father of Mike Goldman, also a TV and radio personality and voice-over artist. 

EntrepreneurJay Goldman

Producer Lucas Goldman

And Actress Alexandria  Goldman

Biography

Goldman was educated in Tamworth, New South Wales and began his radio career at the age of 14, and worked for numerous stations, including 2TM, 2GB, 2UE, 2WS, and 2Day FM. He was the breakfast announcer at 2SM and also broadcast to the Super-Radio Network.

As a television presenter, Goldman hosted the first colour transmission in Australia, ABC's Countdown, as well as other work including live musical show Stairway to the Stars on the Seven Network, Juke Box Jury for the Seven Network in Brisbane, It's A Small World for Network Ten in Brisbane, the Lottery Draw on the Nine Network in Sydney and others.

Goldman was a Feature presenter at the Big Day Out Rock Concert in 1970 and numerous other high-profile pop and rock concerts, and the ground announcer for all events held at Stadium Australia, and various sports events including the 2000 Summer Olympics. He also did voice-over work for a number of commercial and tourism-related purposes.

Goldman was also well known for his voiceover work for CityRail in Sydney, which was used for most platform announcements across the train network for many years. 

Goldman lived on the Northern Beaches, Sydney. He died of cancer at his home on 17 January 2020, aged 69.

References

1950 births
2020 deaths
Australian television personalities
People from Wagga Wagga
Former 2GB presenters